Dagmar Evelyn Cyrulla is an Australian contemporary artist and Archibald finalist . In 2022 she was named one of Australia's 100 hottest collectable artists. Her work is about relationships, especially those from a woman’s perspective. In 2017, her painting, 'I Am' was 'Highly Commended' in the Doug Moran portrait prize. In 2017 her work 'The phone call IV' won the Manning regional gallery's "Naked and Nude" art prize.

Background 
Cyrulla was born in Germany, at the age of one she came to live in Sydney along with her two siblings. Cyrulla graduated a degree in Bachelor of Visual Arts from University of Western Sydney in 1987. In 2009 she earned her Masters of Fine Art via scholarship at Monash University. She has participated in group exhibitions since 1988, and has held solo exhibitions in Perth, Melbourne & Sydney.

Artistic work 
Cyrulla's work revolves around human relatedness. In October 2018 her exhibited work at Wagner Contemporary Gallery was analysed as “Cyrulla intends to challenge our thoughts in a newly interconnected world that is increasingly concerned with the future of women’s rights and passionately discussing the nuances of gender equality. Displaying a more traditional approach to feminist practice, Cyrulla’s women ‘all have a certain strength, but without losing their femininity or vulnerability.’ They appear confident in their exposure and beautiful Mikey in their imperfection, whether they are captured as ‘they reflect on themselves and their world unperturbed by the viewer’s gaze’, or as they meet our eyes in defiance of objectification. The Australian newspaper described her work as  "Recognised for producing works of stirring psychological intensity, Cyrulla has brought a new dimension to contemporary Australian art". Australian artist profile depicted her work as "natural with the technological",  while ABC Radio National termed her a 'portrait painter'.

In 2014, Cyrulla was invited to become a member of the Twenty Melbourne Painters Society

Cyrulla was the winner of the Williamstown Festival Contemporary Art prize, and the Naked and Nude Art Prize 2017 was hung in the Dobell Prize at the Art Gallery of New South Wales, 5 times, including for 'Fleeting' in 2011.

Public collections 
Bathurst Regional Gallery
Ballarat Regional Gallery (A Moment II, The Carer III.)
Chicago Printmakers Collective 
London Print Workshop

Solo exhibitions 
 2022 Wagner Contemporary (November) "End of a chapter" 
 2021 Wagner Contemporary (November) "Recent Works"
2018 Wagner Contemporary (October) "I Am"
 2016 Wagner Contemporary (September) “Moments”
 2015 Galerie Notre Dame France (April)
 2014 Reflection Wagner Art Gallery, New South Wales, Australia

Prizes and competitions 

 2021	Royal South Australian Society of Arts (RSASA) Portrait Prize winner
2021	Archibald Prize finalist 

2019	Finalist Dobell drawing prize, https://www.dobell.nas.edu.au/finalists-1
2017	Moran Portrait prize -  finalist &  highly commended by judges
2017	Naked and Nude - winner of Manning Regional Gallery
2014	Doug Moran - Semi Finalist and finalist
2011	Finalist Dobell drawing prize, Art Gallery of New South Wales, Sydney

References

External links 
Dagmar Cyrulla website

21st-century Australian painters
Australian women painters
Year of birth missing (living people)
Living people
German emigrants to Australia